Vendelin Jurion (4 June 1806 – 10 February 1892) was a Luxembourgish politician and jurist.

Jurion was born on 4 June 1806 in Bitburg, now in Germany but then a part of the French département of Forets (and, until its annexation by France, of the Duchy of Luxembourg).  Jurion became an advocate on the district court in Diekirch, and later in Luxembourg City.  While in Diekirch, he sat on the communal council, becoming mayor.

In 1843, Jurion entered the administration of Luxembourg.  He was elected to represent the canton of Diekirch on the Constituent Assembly, in 1848.  When Luxembourg's first constitution was promulgated in 1848, he entered the Chamber of Deputies and served in the cabinet of Prime Minister Gaspard-Théodore-Ignace de la Fontaine as Administrator-General for the Interior.  He returned to government in this capacity under Charles-Mathias Simons (1853–1856).

After leaving the Chamber of Deputies, he entered the Council of State, over which he presided between 1871 and 1872.

Footnotes

1806 births
1892 deaths
People from Bitburg
Government ministers of Luxembourg
Presidents of the Council of State of Luxembourg
Mayors of Diekirch
Members of the Constituent Assembly of Luxembourg
Members of the Chamber of Deputies (Luxembourg)
Members of the Council of State of Luxembourg
Councillors in Diekirch
Independent politicians in Luxembourg
19th-century Luxembourgian lawyers